Matthew Thomas "Matt" Gilman (born July 15, 1985) is an American Christian musician. His first release was with Forerunner Music in 2008, Holy, with Cory Asbury. The second album, Awaken Love, was released in 2013 by Forerunner Music. This album was his breakthrough release on the Billboard magazine Christian Albums and Heatseekers Albums charts. He currently leads worship with Influence Music, who are based at Influence Church.

Early life
Gilman was born on July 15, 1985, in Minneapolis, Minnesota to a Lutheran-preacher father, Thomas Richard Gilman, and mother, Patricia Lynn Monnier. He started to lead worship services at his father's church when he was 14 years old. He graduated high school in 2002 and subsequently relocated to Kansas City, Missouri, to join the International House of Prayer; this is where he was based out of for a decade, until his departure in 2012.

Personal life
Gilman has twin sons, Isaac and Caden. He lives in Orlando, Florida, and travels monthly to Influence Church in Anaheim Hills, CA, to lead worship.

Music career
Gilman's music career commenced in 2008, with the co-released album, Holy, with Cory Asbury, and it was released by Forerunner Music on July 10, 2008. His second album, Awaken Love, was released on August 27, 2013, by Forerunner Music. The album was his breakthrough release upon the Billboard magazine charts, where it placed on the Christian Albums chart at No. 19 and the Heatseekers Albums chart at No. 8. Gilman is presently part of an artist collective known as Influence Music, which was birthed out of Influence Church in Anaheim Hills, CA. http://influencemusicofficial.com Gilman has been leading worship since the age of 14, having grown up in ministry with his father, a Lutheran pastor. In 2002, when Gilman was a senior in high school, he arrived at the International House of Prayer of Kansas City thinking he was just attending a conference about music, his favorite subject. Speaking about this, Gilman said: "As soon as I walked into the building, I knew this was different. It was not at all what I was expecting. God began to shake me to the core as He opened up a whole new understanding of worship with the Word of God. I knew right away this is what I was made for." After serving for ten years as a worship leader at the International House of Prayer, Gilman took up a position with the Orlando House of Prayer.

As an artist, Gilman has over 27,000 monthly listeners on Spotify and averages 300,000 plays per track. In January 2017, Gilman visited Influence Church in Anaheim California to guest speak and lead worship. He currently travels to Anaheim once a month to lead worship and co-write with the team. Gilman said: "Influence Church is a body of believers that truly acts as the hands and feet of Jesus. It has been a place of deep healing, refreshing, restoration and musical inspiration for me. I’m so honored to get to run with such an amazing and authentic group of people that I get to call my family."

Discography

Studio albums

References

1985 births
Living people
American performers of Christian music
Musicians from Minneapolis
Musicians from Kansas City, Missouri
Musicians from Orlando, Florida
Songwriters from Minnesota
Songwriters from Missouri
Songwriters from Florida